Kodanad (கோடநாடு) is a panchayat located in the Kothagiri zone of Nilgiris district in Tamil Nadu state, India. The spoken language of this region is Tamil.

Population
As per the census of 2011, the total population of the panchayat is 4385 in which 2184 were female and 2201 were male.

Kodanad View point
It is located  about 18 km east of Kotagiri on the eastern edges of Nilgiris at 11°31′29″N 76°54′57″E. Due to the location it is also called the Terminus Country.

Tamil Nadu